Madree Penn White (November 21, 1892 – January 31, 1967) was an American editor, educator, businesswoman and suffragist. She was one of the founders of Delta Sigma Theta, and the sorority's second president.

Early life and education 
Madree Penn was born in Atchison, Kansas, and raised in Omaha, Nebraska, the daughter of John Penn and Mattie Gordon Penn.  In 1908 she took second prize in an essay contest about the work of Robert Burns. In 1909 she represented the Literary and Historical Society of Omaha in an oratory contest, with a speech titled "Standard Bearers". She graduated from Central High School in Omaha in 1909.

Penn graduated from Howard University in 1914. At Howard, she was the first woman editor of the school newspaper, an officer of the campus YWCA and NAACP chapters. She was one of the 22 founding members of Delta Sigma Theta sorority. She was president of Delta Sigma Theta from 1913 to 1919. She marched in the 1913 women's suffrage march in Washington, D.C. with her sorority. In 1914, she won first prize with in a scholarship contest held by the National League on Urban Conditions Among Negroes.

Career 
Penn was one of the women who met at the White House with President Warren G. Harding about women's suffrage in 1920. She was executive secretary of the YWCA in Charlotte, North Carolina. She was president of the Kaffir Chemical Laboratories in Omaha. She was associate editor of the Omaha Monitor, and of the Howard University Alumni Journal. She owned and managed a printing company, Triangle Press Company, in St. Louis, Missouri. She taught Latin at the National Training School for Girls in Washington, D.C., and taught at the Tucker Business College and Douglas University. She was active in the League of Women Voters. 

In 1963, White led a Delta Sigma Theta group in the 50th anniversary re-enactment of the 1913 suffrage march in Washington, D.C. In 1966, she was honored by the Cleveland chapter of the League of Women Voters, for her participation in the 1913 inauguration of Woodrow Wilson and her work on a committee headed by Carrie Chatman Catt.

Personal life 
Madree Penn married physician James Eathel White, and had two children. They divorced in 1930. She died in 1967, aged 74 years.

References 

1892 births
1967 deaths
People from Atchison, Kansas
People from Omaha, Nebraska
Howard University alumni
American suffragists
Delta Sigma Theta founders
American women in business
American newspaper editors
American educators